Morahan is a surname. Notable people with the surname include:

 Andy Morahan (born 1958), English commercial, film and music video director
 Caroline Morahan (born 1977), Irish actress and television host
 Christopher Morahan (born 1929), English stage and television director and producing manager
 Edythe Morahan de Lauzon, Canadian poet
 Eugene Morahan (1869–1949), American sculptor
 Hattie Morahan (born 1978), English television, film and stage actress
 Jim Morahan (1902–1976), British art director
 Luke Morahan (born 1990), Australian Rugby Union Player
 Thomas Morahan (1931–2010), member of the New York State Senate
 Thomas N. Morahan (1906-1969), British film designer